The acronym XCIS can refer to the following:

 XCIS client, a graphical X-based Linux client for cluster information services. 
 XICS, as a common misspelling for an X-based client of internet chess servers.